is a village located in Kushiro Subprefecture, Hokkaido. As of September 30, 2016, it has an estimated population of 2,516, and an area of 571.84 km2.

Tsurui is a breeding ground for the red-crowned crane, one of the 100 Soundscapes of Japan.

History 
The village was formed in 1937.

Climate

Mascots 

They are red-crowned crane brothers. They are shaped like bogs of the Kushiro-shitsugen National Park.
Tsurubo is the oldest of the siblings. His tail resembles a cosmos flower.
Hinabo is the youngest of the siblings.

References

External links 
 
 Official Website 

1937 establishments in Japan
Populated places established in 1937
Villages in Hokkaido